Arman Ali Pasha, (Urdu: ارمان علی پاشا) better known as Arman Pasha, is a Pakistani actor and model who started his acting career while doing modelling gigs in Pakistan, in 2016 he was offered a role in Hum TV’s televisions drama serial Adhi Gawahi. He has since worked in a number of television serials including Rashk, Jaltay Khawab, Hoor Pari, Ajnabi Lage Zindagi, Mujhe Rang De and Noor. In 2020, Arman played the role of a superstar in love with a fan in Aaj Entertainment’s Meri Mishaal.

Television

Films 

 Heart Beat (2021)

References 

Living people
1996 births
Pakistani male actors